Donald Rawe, Cornish publisher, dramatist, novelist, and poet. Born in Padstow in 1930, he has lived most of his life near the northern coast. He became a member of Gorseth Kernow in 1970, under the Bardic name of Scryfer Lanwednoc ('Writer of Padstow'). He died in 2018.

Works
Gorseth Byrth Kernow: Bards of the Gorsedd of Cornwall 1928-1967, Penzance, 1967.

References

People from Padstow
Bards of Gorsedh Kernow
1930 births
Living people
Dramatists and playwrights from Cornwall
Novelists from Cornwall
Poets from Cornwall